The United States District Court for the Eastern District of Kentucky (in case citations, E.D. Ky.)  is the Federal district court whose jurisdiction comprises approximately the Eastern half of the Commonwealth of Kentucky.
The United States Court of Appeals for the Sixth Circuit in Cincinnati, Ohio maintains appellate jurisdiction for the district (except for patent claims and claims against the U.S. government under the Tucker Act, which are appealed to the Federal Circuit).

Jurisdiction 
The Eastern District of Kentucky encompasses the following counties: Anderson, Bath, Bell, Boone, Bourbon, Boyd, Boyle, Bracken, Breathitt, Campbell, Carroll, Carter, Clark, Clay, Elliott, Estill, Fayette, Fleming, Floyd, Franklin, Gallatin, Garrard, Grant, Greenup, Harlan, Harrison, Henry, Jackson, Jessamine, Johnson, Kenton, Knott, Knox, Laurel, Lawrence, Lee, Leslie, Letcher, Lewis, Lincoln, McCreary, Madison, Magoffin, Martin, Mason, Menifee, Mercer, Montgomery, Morgan, Nicholas, Owen, Owsley, 
Pendleton, Perry, Pike, Powell, Pulaski, Robertson, Rockcastle, Rowan, Scott, Shelby, Trimble, Wayne, Whitley, Wolfe, and Woodford.

History 

The United States District Court for the District of Kentucky was one of the original 13 courts established by the Judiciary Act of 1789, on September 24, 1789. At the time, Kentucky was not yet a state, but was within the territory of the state of Virginia. The District was unchanged when Kentucky became a state on June 1, 1792. On February 13, 1801, the Judiciary Act of 1801, abolished the U.S. district court in Kentucky, but the repeal of this Act restored the District on March 8, 1802, .

Meeting places 
The court is based in Lexington and also holds sessions in Federal Courthouses in Ashland, Covington, Frankfort, London and Pikeville. The court also meets in Richmond and Jackson. From 1911 to 1985, the court held sessions in downtown Catlettsburg at the Federal Courthouse and Post Office building which still stands on the corner of 25th and Broadway.  By 1980, the Eastern District had long outgrown the historic Catlettsburg facility and it was decided that a new facility should be constructed.  City officials in neighboring Ashland requested that the new facility be located there instead of in Catlettsburg.  They argued that Ashland, by being a larger city, was a superior choice to the much smaller Catlettsburg with more services and amenities such as lodging for overnight guests and better restaurant options.   As a result, the Carl D. Perkins Federal Building and United States Courthouse was built in Ashland on U.S. Routes 23 and 60 (Greenup Avenue).

U.S. Attorney 
The United States Attorney's Office for the Eastern District of Kentucky represents the United States in civil and criminal litigation in the court. The United States Attorney is Carlton S. Shier, IV, since March 21, 2022.

Current judges 
:

Vacancies and pending nominations

Former judges

Chief judges

Succession of seats

See also 
 Courts of Kentucky
 List of current United States district judges
 List of United States federal courthouses in Kentucky

References

External links 
 United States District Court for the Eastern District of Kentucky Official Website
 United States Attorney for the Eastern District of Kentucky Official Website

Kentucky, Eastern District
Kentucky law
Lexington, Kentucky
Ashland, Kentucky
Kenton County, Kentucky
Frankfort, Kentucky
Laurel County, Kentucky
Pike County, Kentucky
Madison County, Kentucky
Breathitt County, Kentucky
Boyd County, Kentucky
Courthouses in Kentucky
Eastern Kentucky Coalfield
1901 establishments in Kentucky